Hypomyces lactifluorum, the lobster mushroom, contrary to its common name, is not a mushroom, but rather a parasitic ascomycete fungus that grows on certain species of mushrooms, turning them a reddish orange color that resembles the outer shell of a cooked lobster.  H. lactifluorum specifically attacks members of the genera Lactarius and Lactifluus (milk-caps), and Russula (brittlegills), such as Russula brevipes and Lactifluus piperatus in North America. At maturity, H. lactifluorum thoroughly covers its host, rendering it unidentifiable. Lobster mushrooms are widely eaten and enjoyed fresh. They are commercially marketed and sometimes found in grocery stores; they have been made available at markets in Oregon. They have a seafood-like flavor and a firm, dense texture.

A study from Quebec found that the infected lobster mushroom mostly contains the DNA of the parasitic fungus with only trace amounts of Russula brevipes DNA. This study also measured intermediate products of chemical reactions, or metabolites, in infected and non-infected mushrooms. Metabolites help determine how fungi look and taste, and whether they are fit to eat. They found that through the course of its infection, the parasitic fungus completely alters the diversity and amount of metabolites in Russula brevipes.

While edible, field guides note the hypothetical possibility that H. lactifluorum could parasitize a toxic host and that individuals should avoid consuming lobster mushrooms with unknown hosts, although no instances of toxicity have been recorded.  During the course of infection, the chemicals get converted into other more flavorful compounds, making lobster mushrooms more edible. Lactarius piperatus has a spicy, hot flavor but that flavor is counteracted by the parasite H. lactifluorum, making it more edible and delicious. One author notes that he has personally never experienced any trouble from consuming them and another notes that there have been no reports of poisoning in hundreds of years of consumption. White, pink and yellow molds could be toxic lookalike species.

Similar species include Hypomyces cervinigenus, H. chrysospermus, and H. luteovirens.

References

External links

A lobster mushroom article on Tom's Fungi
AmericanMushrooms.com: Lobster Mushroom
Lobster mushroom on mykoweb

Hypocreaceae
Edible fungi
Parasitic fungi
Taxa named by Lewis David de Schweinitz